The KGI Bank is a commercial bank of Taiwan, Under the China Development Financial Holding Corporation. Its Headquarter is located in Zuoying District, Kaohsiung, Taiwan.

History

Cosmos Bank 
The financial institution founded by Hsu Sheng-fa obtained its incorporation approval on 13 August 1991 as Cosmos Bank. It acquired its license on 14 January 1992 and commenced its business on 12 February 1992.

On 10 February 2014, the bank agreed on share-swap to make it a subsidiary of China Development Financial Holding Corporation (CDF) and officially became CDF subsidiary on 15 September 2014. In 2014, CDF acquired Cosmos Bank as a subsidiary at the cost of NT$23.09 billion, and in 2015 Cosmos Bank became known as “KGI Commercial Bank”.

KGI Bank 
In January 2015, the bank was renamed as KGI Bank.

From this point on, CDIB's Corporate Finances and Financial Markets were ceded to KGI Commercial Bank.

See also

List of banks in Taiwan
China Development Financial Holding Corporation

References

External links

 

Banks of Taiwan
Banks established in 1992
Companies based in Kaohsiung
Taiwanese companies established in 1992